Baron Paul Adrien François Marie de Lezay-Marnésia (born August 9, 1769, in Moutonne, died on 9 October 1814, in Haguenau) was a French prefect.

His family had Spanish roots. Lezay-Marnésia met his wife Françoise de Briqueville in Forges-les-Eaux, in Normandy.

Under the Directoire, he was forced to flee to Switzerland and returned to France on 17 May 1801. Napoleon I of France gave him a diplomatic mission to Hungary in 1803.

He was prefect of the département Rhin-et-Moselle 1806–1810 in Koblenz.

Appointed as prefect of the département Bas-Rhin on 12 February 1810, he organized the receipt of the Archduchess Marie Louise, Duchess of Parma, wife of Napoleon, in March in Strasbourg. Thereafter, its director was focused on improving living conditions in rural areas.

1769 births
1814 deaths
People from Jura (department)
French politicians
Prefects of France
Prefects of Bas-Rhin